Duncan McPhee (17 October 1892 – 22 September 1950) was a British middle-distance runner. He competed in the men's 1500 metres at the 1920 Summer Olympics.

References

1892 births
1950 deaths
Athletes (track and field) at the 1920 Summer Olympics
British male middle-distance runners
Olympic athletes of Great Britain
Place of birth missing